Xanthophyllum flavescens is a plant in the family Polygalaceae. The specific epithet  is from the Latin meaning "becoming yellow", referring to the leaves.

Description
The bark is grey or greenish brown. The flowers are yellow, white or pink.

Distribution and habitat
Xanthophyllum flavescens grows naturally in continental Southeast Asia and western Malesia. Its habitat is mixed dipterocarp or montane forests from sea-level to  altitude.

References

flavescens
Flora of tropical Asia
Plants described in 1820
Fabales of Asia